is a passenger railway station located in the city of Ebina, Kanagawa, Japan and operated by the private railway operator Sagami Railway (Sotetsu). It is located near the border of Ebina with Zama and Ayase.

Lines

Station layout
The station consists of two island platforms connected by to an elevated station building located above the platforms and tracks.

Platforms

Adjacent stations

History
Kashiwadai Station was opened on August 19, 1975 on the site of the former Kashiwadai train factory operated by the Sagami Railway since 1967.

Passenger statistics
In fiscal 2019, the station was used by an average of 18,666 passengers daily..

The passenger figures for previous years are as shown below.

Surrounding area
Shoyo Kashiwadai Hospital

See also
 List of railway stations in Japan

References

External links

official home page.

Railway stations in Japan opened in 1975
Railway stations in Kanagawa Prefecture
Ebina, Kanagawa